There are 74 living languages in Kalimantan. They belong to Malayo-Polynesian subgroup of Austronesian family. Also Tringgus-Sembaan Bidayuh language is spoken as an immigrant language.

According to Ethnologue, the languages belong to five families:

References

See also
 Greater North Borneo languages

Kalimantan